Dionysius Ó Mórdha, Bishop of Clonfert, died 1534.

References
 A New History of Ireland: Volume IX - Maps, Genealogies, Lists, ed. T.W. Moody, F.X. Martin, F.J. Byrne.

People from County Galway
Medieval Gaels from Ireland
16th-century Irish bishops
Bishops of Clonfert
1534 deaths
Year of birth unknown